Gentiana lutea, the great yellow gentian, is a species of gentian native to the mountains of central and southern Europe.

Growth
The flowers are yellow, with the corolla separated nearly to the base into 5–7 narrow petals. It grows in grassy alpine and sub-alpine pastures, usually on calcareous soils.

Uses
Gentiana lutea is remarkable for the intense bitterness of the root and every part of the herbage. Before the introduction of hops, gentian was used occasionally in brewing.

Gentian root has a long history of use as an herbal bitter and is an ingredient of many proprietary medicines. The parts used include the dried, underground parts of the plant and the fresh, above-ground parts. Caution should be exercised as to its use because it is endangered, and the closely related Centaurium erythraea shares many of its constituents and actions.

The name is a tribute to Gentius, an Illyrian king who was thought to have found out that the herb had tonic properties.

In veterinary pharmacopeia in the 1860s, gentian root or gentian radix was considered useful as a tonic and stomachic.

Extracts of gentian root can be found in the American soft drink Moxie, and its unique flavor is attributed to that fact. It is used in France to produce a number of bitter liqueurs, including Salers in the Cantal, and a Limousin specialty liqueur and aperitif called Avèze. The plants are now cultivated in the Auvergne area in view of their protected status, and they are no longer harvested from the wild in the Auvergne mountains.

The European Gentian Association in Lausanne, Cercle Européen d'Etude des Gentianacées,  has the objective to develop the knowledge and uses of yellow gentian and other species of Gentianaceae.

Gentiana lutea is depicted on the reverse of the Albanian 2000 lekë banknote, issued in 2008. The note depicts King Gentius on its obverse.

Chemical constituents

The bitter principles of gentian root are secoiridoid glycosides amarogentin and gentiopicrin. The former is one of the most bitter natural compounds known and is used as a scientific basis for measuring bitterness.

References

External links
 
 
 Flower Gallery :: Gentianaceae

lutea
Flora of the Pyrenees
Medicinal plants of Europe
Plants described in 1753
Taxa named by Carl Linnaeus
Herbs
Spices